The Atlas languages are a subgroup of the Northern Berber languages of the Afro-Asiatic language family spoken in the Atlas Mountains of Morocco. By mutual intelligibility, they are a single language spoken by perhaps 14 million people; however, they are distinct sociolinguistically and are considered separate languages by the Royal institute of the Amazigh culture. They are:
 Central Atlas Tamazight (Central Atlas Berber), spoken in the central Atlas Mountains
 Shilha (Tashelhiyt; also rendered Tachelhit, Tasusit; includes Judeo-Berber and perhaps the extinct Lisan al-Gharbi), spoken in southern Morocco
 Sanhaja de Srair, spoken in the southern part of the Rif
 Ghomara, spoken in the western part of the Rif
 Lisan al-Gharbi, formerly spoken in western Morocco.

References

Berber languages